Rod Colbin  (born Irving Herbert Lichtenstein: December 23, 1923 – February 4, 2007) was an American character actor whose career spanned four decades. He was also a fencing instructor who, at one time, served as Katharine Hepburn's personal masseur. He was born to Jewish parents in New Haven, CT, the son of Samuel (made gravestones) and Bess (Silverdollar) Lichtenstein.

Marriages and family
Rod married Annemarie Polonyi on September 16, 1965; they divorced in 1978. They had three daughters: Johanna, who died at age 4, Shana Rebecca, and Kaila Johanna.

Death
Colbin died in February 2007 in Denver, Colorado after a series of strokes. He was 83. Colbin was survived by two daughters, two grandchildren and two sisters.

Filmography

 1954 – Man Against Crime  (TV series) ... as Baxter  
 1955 – Mr. Citizen  (TV series)    
 1966 – The Edge of Night... as Doorman  
 1975 – Sanford and Son  (TV series) ... as Coach Bradley in original "Grady" TV series pilot
 1975 –  Maude ... as Boozer
 1975–1976 –  Marcus Welby, M.D. (2 episodes) ... as Dr. Tom Leonard
 1976 – Insight  (TV series)  
 1976 – Harry O ... as Administrator
 1976 – The Gumball Rally
 1976 – Mary Hartman, Mary Hartman (4 episodes) ... as Commissioner Rittenhouse
 1977 – Alice (1 episode) as Edger Patton in the episode "The Bus"
 1977 – John Hus ... as John Hus  
 1977 – The Jeffersons (TV series) (1 episode) as Mr. Billings in episode "The Grand Opening: Part 2"
 1977 – Lou Grant (TV series) as Warren Woods in episode "The Scoop"
 1977 – Charlie's Angels (TV series) as Dr. Eggars in episode titled "Little Angels of the Night"
 1977 – 1982 Barney Miller (TV series)...Various roles (7 episodes)
 1978 – To Kill a Cop (TV Movie) ... as Chief Emerson
 1979 – Anatomy of a Seduction (TV movie) 
 1979 – 1980 The Ropers (TV series) ... Hubert Armbrewster (4 episodes)
 1979 – 1980 Quincy, M.E. (TV series) Dr.Lang/George Myers (4 episodes)
 1980 – Rape and Marriage: The Rideout Case (TV movie)  
 1980 – A Change of Seasons ... Sam Bingham 
 1981 – Harper Valley PTA (TV series)...Chief Palmer (2 episodes)
 1981 – Sanford (TV series)...Judge
 1980 – 1981 Flo (TV series)...2 episodes
 1981 – 1982 Three's Company (TV series)...as Mr. Frankin/Mr. Hadley in 2 episodes
 1981 – 1982 The Greatest American Hero (TV series) as General Enright / Theodore Svenson (2 episodes)
 1982 – Yes, Giorgio ...Ted Mullane
 1982 – Frances ...Sentencing Judge
 1983 – Ghost Dancing ...Arch
 1983 – Remington Steele ...Carlos Mondragon (1 episode)
 1983 – Hardcastle and McCormick (TV series)
 1984 – The A-Team ...Jes Hicks
 1984 – Frankenstein's Great Aunt Tillie ...Grocer Schnitt
 1984 – Gimme a Break! ...Dr. Kessler
 1984 – Little House: The Last Farewell ...Mr. Davis
 1985 – Torchlight ...Dr. Urban
 1986 – The Twilight Zone (TV series) ...Minister (segment "Red Snow")

References

External links

 (archive)

1923 births
2007 deaths
American male film actors
American male television actors
American male stage actors
Jewish American male actors
Male actors from New Haven, Connecticut
20th-century American male actors
20th-century American Jews
21st-century American Jews